From a Radio Engine to the Photon Wing was released in 1977 and is the ninth album by Michael Nesmith and eighth studio album as a singer/songwriter during his post-Monkees career. The album was Nesmith's second with vocals released on his own label, Pacific Arts.

The song "Love's First Kiss" is rare example of Nesmith collaborating with other songwriters to compose a song.

One single was released from the album in the US and worldwide, "Rio". Because of the length of the song, approximately three minutes were edited out of the song for the release of the single. Additionally, Nesmith recorded a promotional video for the track, "Rio", which was created by Nesmith, William Dear, and William E. Martin.  In other areas of the world where "Rio" gained chart success (such as England and Australia), a follow-up single, "Navajo Trail" b/w "Love's First Kiss", was issued.

Track listing
All songs by Michael Nesmith except where noted.

 "Rio" – 7:02
 "Casablanca Moonlight" – 6:40
 "More Than We Imagine" – 3:22
 "Navajo Trail" (Marjorie Elliott) – 5:39
 "We Are Awake" – 4:54
 "Wisdom Has Its Way" – 5:12
 "Love's First Kiss" (Fred Myrow, Michael Nesmith) – 3:55
 "The Other Room" – 4:20

Charts

Personnel

Michael Nesmith – vocals, guitar
David Briggs – keyboards  
Jerry Carrigan – drums  
Shane Keister – keyboards  
Larrie Londin – drums 
Lonnie Mack – guitar
David MacKay – bass
Weldon Myrick – dobro, pedal steel guitar
Pebble Daniel – background vocals
Linda Hargrove – background vocals
Marcia Routh – background vocals
Nelson Stump - cowbell
Lisa Silver – violin
Greg "Fingers" Taylor – harmonica

References

1977 albums
Michael Nesmith albums